Kirton is a village in Nottinghamshire, England. According to the United Kingdom Census 2001 it had a population of 273, reducing to 261 at the 2011 census.
The parish church of Holy Trinity is 13th century church, restored in 1865 in the Victorian era. Hall Farm was built c. 1630 by William Clarkson. It is an early example of brick facing on walls of rough skerry.

Pub and Restaurant 
The Fox at Kirton is now the only pub in the village. There used to be a total of 3 pubs all of which closed down. The Fox re-opened in March 2022 after a full refurbishment under private ownership, offering a space for both drinkers and diners and a focus on serving quality, homemade food using fresh and local ingredients.

References

External links

 http://www.nottshistory.org.uk/articles/doubleday/kirton1.htm
 https://www.newarkadvertiser.co.uk/news/village-pubs-re-opens-after-almost-a-decade-9249223/

Newark and Sherwood
Villages in Nottinghamshire